Charles Alzieu (6 November 1904 – 14 September 1963) was a French long jumper. He competed at the 1928 Summer Olympics and finished 27th.

References

External links
 

1904 births
1963 deaths
French male long jumpers
Athletes (track and field) at the 1928 Summer Olympics
Olympic athletes of France